Bothrioneurum is a genus of annelids belonging to the family Naididae.

The genus was first described by Stolč in 1886.

Synonym: Bothrioneuron Stolč, 1886

Species:
 Bothrioneurum vejdovskyanum

References

Annelids